Cheick Hamala Diabate is a musician from Mali, West Africa, who has been nominated for a Grammy award. Using Adelphi, Maryland, as his home he travels all over the United States, Canada, Europe, and Asia. He has performed at the Kennedy Center, the United States Senate, and the Smithsonian Institution. Cheick Hamala was born into a griot family in Kita, Mali. From a young age, he learned to play the ngoni, a stringed instrument related to the American banjo. In addition, Cheick has learned the history of Mali passed down for over 800 years. 
Cheick has performed internationally.

History 
Cheick Hamala Diabaté is recognized as one of the world's masters of ngoni, a Malian traditional instrument, and a West African historian in the Griot tradition. A sought-after performer, lecturer, storyteller, and choreographer throughout Africa, Europe, Asia, and Canada, Cheick Hamala began touring in the U.S. in 1995. He has performed at venues such as the Krannert Center, Smithsonian Institution and the John F. Kennedy Center for the Performing Arts.  
 
A steward of the 800-year-old tradition of the Griot, the storytellers of West Africa, Cheick Hamala shares the oral history, music, and song of his culture as it was passed on to him from birth by parent to child. At an early age, Cheick Hamala mastered the ngoni, a stringed lute and ancestor to the banjo. He learned to play the guitar from his uncle, and now plays banjo and several other instruments; but his renown remains with the historical ngoni.

At age 12,, he was invited to the National Institute of Arts in Bamako, Mali's Capital, where he studied music, graphic arts, cinema, literature and theatre. He began his international performing career upon graduation.

Cheick Hamala works with notable traditional African dance companies based in the U.S. as instructor, choreographer, and performer. He also performs solo and with his ensemble, playing traditional Manding Griot instruments. His music always reflects the historical integrity of an important art form with a rich tradition stretching back hundreds of years to the formation of the Great Malian Empire. (courtesy of Mali Music.net)

Awards
 Grammy nomination (2007): Best Traditional World Music Album for "From Mali to America" by Cheick Hamala Diabate & Bob Carlin

Collaborations
Salif Keita
Bela Fleck
Corey Harris
Bob Carlin
Toumani Diabaté
Chopteeth Afrofunk Big Band
Ami Koita
Kandia Kouyate
Yayi Kanoute
Fanta Disco
Fadiala Diawara
Meera Chakravarthy
Rob Coltun

Discography

Albums
 "Ake Ben Mali Denou" (2013)
 "Ake Doni Doni" (2009)
 "From Mali to America" w/ Bob Carlin (2007)
 "Kèlè Manyi Dé" (2006)

Literary Mentions
"In Griot Time," by Banning Eyre (p. 105)
"Griots and Griottes: Masters of Words and Music," by Thomas A. Hale

See also
Ngoni
Banjo

References

 "Rough Guide to West Africa 5" by Richard Trillo
 "Rough Guide to World Music : Volume 1" by Rough Guides
Cheick Hamala Diabate's official website

External links
Cheick Hamala Diabate's official website

Malian musicians
Living people
Year of birth missing (living people)
People from Kita, Mali
People from Adelphi, Maryland
21st-century Malian people